Hatzav (lit. Squill) is a moshav in central Israel. Located on Highway 40 between Gedera and Be'er Sheva, it covers 3,200 dunams and falls under the jurisdiction of Be'er Tuvia Regional Council.

History
The moshav was founded in 1949 by refugees from Tripoli in Libya, including Ben-Zion Halfon, later a member of the Knesset. It was founded on the former lands of the depopulated Palestinian village of Al-Masmiyya al-Kabira.

References

Moshavim
Populated places established in 1949
Populated places in Southern District (Israel)
1949 establishments in Israel
Libyan-Jewish culture in Israel